The Roman Catholic Diocese of Kamloops (erected 22 December 1945) is a suffragan of the Archdiocese of Vancouver. The Diocese of Kamloops is led by Bishop Joseph Phuong Nguyen.

Diocesan demographics
The Diocese of Kamloops has a Catholic population of 51,900 (2006) served by 14 diocesan priests, 8 religious priests, 1 permanent deacon and 26 religious sisters and brothers in 25 parishes.

Ordinaries
 Edward Quentin Jennings (1946–1952), appointed Bishop of Fort William, Ontario
 Michael Alphonsus Harrington (1952–1973)
 Adam Exner (1974–1982), appointed Archbishop of Winnipeg, Manitoba
 Lawrence Sabatini, C.S. (1982–1999) – Bishop Emeritus
 David Monroe (2002–2016) – Bishop Emeritus
 Joseph Phuong Nguyen (2016–present)

Education

Catholic high schools

St. Ann's Academy remained a high school until 1970. Unable to keep up with the changing demands of B.C.'s curriculum, it reverted to an elementary school. In 1980, Bishop Adam Exner asked the Congregation of Christian Brothers to open the high school section and in September 1981, St. Ann's Academy became a high school again.

Religious institutes

Men
Congregation of Christian Brothers (CFC)
Missionary Oblates of Mary Immaculate (OMI)

Women
Congregation of Notre Dame (CND)
Discalced Carmelites (OCD)
Missionary Sisters of Christ the King (MCR)
Sisters of Mission Service (SMS)
Franciscan Sisters of the Immaculate Conception (SFIC)

Sex abuse lawsuit
On August 25, 2020, British Columbia justice David Crossin ordered the office of the Bishop of Kamloops and former priest Erlindo Molon, who was by then 88 years old, to pay $844,140 in damages to Rosemary Anderson, who claimed Molon raped her 75 to 100 times since 1976, when she was 26 years old. During the lawsuit, former Kamloops Bishop Adam Exner, who would eventually be appointed Archbishop of Vancouver, said during witness testimony that he knew Molon “was molesting people,” including Anderson.  Exner also stated that Molon was not stripped of his priesthood status until after Anderson told him that Molon raped her and asked her to marry him.

Publications
Kamloops Wawa, a one-time publication of the diocese
Diocesan News, bi-monthly newspaper started in 1976 as the Diocesan Update. Name changed to the Diocesan News in 1990.

References

External links
Roman Catholic Diocese of Kamloops official site

Kamloops
Christian organizations established in 1945
Kamloops
History of British Columbia
Roman Catholic dioceses and prelatures established in the 20th century